Somatolophia haydenata is a species of moth in the family Geometridae first described by Alpheus Spring Packard  in 1876. It is found in North America.

The MONA or Hodges number for Somatolophia haydenata is 6947.

References

Further reading

 
 
 

Ourapterygini